Viduj (also Romanized as Vīdūj; also known as Vidūch) is a village in Golab Rural District, Barzok District, Kashan County, Isfahan Province, Iran. At the 2016 census, its population was 1,638 in 546 families.

References 

Populated places in Kashan County